Ghulam Nabi Khayal is a poet and essayist from kashmir. He has authored 30 books in Kashmiri, Urdu and English.

Ghulam Nabi Khayal was the winner of Sahitya Akademi Award but he returned the award as a sign of protest. He became the fist Kashmiri to return the literary award as a sign of protest in the valley.

Books 
 ALLAMA IQBAL AUR TAHREEK-E-AZADI-E-KASHMIR
  GAASHIR MUNAAR
 CHINAR RANG
 FIKR-E-KHAYAL
 IQBAL AUR TEHREEK-E-AZADI-E-KASHMIR
 KARVAAN-E-KHAYAL
 KHAYALAT
 KHAYAL-E-QALAM
 PRAGAASH

Awards 
Sahitya Akademi Award in year 1975.

References 

People from Jammu and Kashmir
Kashmiri poets
Kashmiri people
Recipients of the Sahitya Akademi Award in Kashmiri
People from Srinagar